Spring House or Spring house may refer to:

 Spring house (or springhouse), a small building used for refrigeration found in rural areas
 Spring House, Pennsylvania, a census-designated place in Montgomery County, Pennsylvania
 Spring House (Barryville, New York), a historic inn in Sullivan County, New York
 Spring House (Pittsford, New York), a historic inn in Monroe County, New York
 Springhouse, an American medical publishing company acquired by Lippincott Williams & Wilkins

See also 
 Spring House Gazebo, a historic gazebo of Eden Park in Cincinnati, Ohio
 Otter Spring House, a historic spring house in the Town of Lincoln in Forest County, Wisconsin